The White Chuck River is a river in the U.S. state of Washington. It is a tributary of the Sauk River.

Course
The White Chuck River originates on the slopes of Glacier Peak in the Cascade Range, near White Chuck Cinder Cone. It flows generally northwest to join the Sauk River south of Darrington. The Sauk River in turn joins the Skagit River, which empties into Skagit Bay, part of Puget Sound.

See also
 List of rivers of Washington

References

Rivers of Washington (state)
North Cascades of Washington (state)
Rivers of Snohomish County, Washington